Events from the year 1727 in art.

Events
 Pierre Subleyras, a Provençal painter, wins the Prix de Rome at the age of 28.

Paintings
 Canaletto
 The Stonemason's Yard (Campo S. Vidal and Santa Maria della Carità, Venice) (approximate date)
 Venice: S. Geremia and the Entrance to the Cannaregio (British Royal Collection, Windsor Castle)
 Balthasar Denner – Portrait of George Frideric Handel
 Panagiotis Doxaras – Ceiling of Church of Saint Spyridon, Corfu
 Charles Jervas – Portrait of Queen Caroline of Ansbach
 Giovanni Battista Pittoni – Approximate date
 Allegorical Tomb for Isaac Newton
 Frescoes with scenes from the life of Diana, palazzetto Widman, Bagnoli di Sopra
 Sebastiano Ricci
 Agar in the desert
 Ecstasy of St. Teresa
 Jacob blesses the sons of Joseph
 Moses saved from the waters
 Rebecca and Eliazer at the well
 Saint Gaetano heals the Sick
 Sir James Thornhill – Painted Hall of Royal Hospital for Seamen, Greenwich (1707–27)

Births
 April 20 – Josef Jáchym Redelmayer, Czech painter, fresco painter and theater decorator (died 1788)
 May 14 – Thomas Gainsborough, English artist (died 1788)
 May 18/19 – Felix Ivo Leicher, Czech-born Viennese painter of altarpieces and secular works (died 1812)
 August 30 – Giovanni Domenico Tiepolo, Italian painter and printmaker in etching (died 1804)
 December 14 – François-Hubert Drouais, French painter (died 1775)
 date unknown
 Don Manuel Alvarez, Spanish sculptor (died 1797)
 Ivan Argunov, Russian painter (died 1802)
 Pietro Campana, Spanish engraver (died 1765)
 Francesco Giuseppe Casanova, Italian painter and a younger brother of Giacomo Casanova (died 1803)
 Mason Chamberlin, English portrait painter (died 1787)
 Giovanni Battista Cipriani, Italian painter and engraver (died 1785)
 William Elliott, English engraver (died 1766)
 Jean-Claude Richard, French painter and engraver (died 1791)
 Giulio Traballesi, Italian designer and engraver (died 1812)
 probable
 Antonio Baratta, Italian designer and engraver (death unknown)
 George Hepplewhite, English furniture designer (died 1786)
 Andrea Toresani, Italian painter and draughtsman of landscapes and portraits (died 1760)

Deaths
 January 5 - Giovanni Antonio Burrini, Bolognese painter of Late-Baroque or Rococo style (born 1656)
 February 6 – Charles Boit, Swedish painter in vitreous enamels (born 1662)
 April 29 – François Coudray, French sculptor (born 1678)
 May 18 – Norbert Roettiers, Flemish engraver (born 1665)
 August 27 – Aert de Gelder, Dutch artist in the tradition of Rembrandt (born 1645)
 September 8 – Giuseppe Bartolomeo Chiari, Italian painter of frescoes (born 1654)
October – Michiel Carree, Dutch painter (born 1657)
 date unknown
 Claude Duflos, French engraver (born 1665)
 Alessio Erardi, Maltese painter (born 1669)
 Pietro Erardi, Maltese chaplain and painter (born 1644)
 Perpète Evrard, Flemish painter of portraits and miniatures (born 1662)
 Pellegrino Antonio Orlandi, art historian (born 1660)
 Andrés Pérez, Spanish Baroque painter (born 1660)
 Pablo González Velázquez, Spanish Baroque painter (born 1664)
 Matthijs Wulfraet, Dutch Golden Age painter (born 1648)
 Jan van der Vaardt, Dutch painter of portraits, landscapes and trompe-l'œil (born 1650)

References

 
Years of the 18th century in art
1720s in art